Yan Sen (阎森; born August 16, 1975) is a Chinese table tennis player.

Major performances
1996 ITTF Pro Tour Grand Finals - 1st doubles
1997 Yugoslavian Open - 1st doubles
1997 World Championships in Manchester - bronze singles
1998 Asian Games - 1st team
1998 Asian Championships - 1st team
1999 World Championships - 2nd doubles (with Wang Liqin), 5th mixed doubles
2000 Sydney Olympic Games - 1st doubles (with Wang Liqin)
2000 World Men's Club Championships - 1st team
2001 ITTF Pro Tour Grand Finals - 1st doubles (with Wang Liqin)
2001 World Championships - 1st doubles (with Wang Liqin)
2002 Qatar Open - 1st doubles
2002 Asian Games - 1st team; 3rd doubles
2003 World Championships - 1st doubles

References
 - China Daily

1975 births
Living people
Chinese male table tennis players
Table tennis players at the 2000 Summer Olympics
Olympic table tennis players of China
Olympic gold medalists for China
Olympic medalists in table tennis
Asian Games medalists in table tennis
Table tennis players from Jiangsu
Sportspeople from Xuzhou
Table tennis players at the 1998 Asian Games
Table tennis players at the 2002 Asian Games
Medalists at the 2000 Summer Olympics
Medalists at the 1998 Asian Games
Medalists at the 2002 Asian Games
Asian Games gold medalists for China
Asian Games bronze medalists for China
Nanjing Sport Institute alumni
20th-century Chinese people